Orbita is a Soviet-Russian system of broadcasting and delivering TV signals via satellites. It is considered to be the first national network of satellite television.

The Orbita  system is based on communication satellites in highly elliptical Molniya orbits, as well as on many ground downlink TV stations for reception and relaying TV signals to antennas of TV sets of many local areas. The full deployment of the Orbita satellite system took place on 25 October 1967 when ground downlink stations of some cities of Soviet Siberia and the Far East began to receive regular TV programmes from Moscow-based uplink stations via a constellation of Molniya satellites.

External links
Molniya satellites : the description
Molniya satellites 
Russian TV celebrates 70th Anniversary
Communications
Earth Application Satellites

Communications satellites of the Soviet Union
Earth observation satellites of the Soviet Union
Television in the Soviet Union
Satellite television
Telecommunications-related introductions in 1967